Worton is a civil parish in the West Oxfordshire district about  south of Banbury, England. It was formed in 1932 by the merger of the parishes of Nether Worton and Over Worton, each of which is a small village. The main road between Deddington and Swerford is the parish's northern boundary. It was a turnpike road and is now the B4031. From there the parish extends  to Worton Wood on its southern boundary. The 2011 Census recorded the population of Worton parish as 624.

References

External links

Civil parishes in Oxfordshire
West Oxfordshire District